The 2008 Asian Junior Badminton Championships were held in Kuala Lumpur, Malaysia from 13–20 July.

Medalists

Medal table

External links
Team Event at Tournamentsoftware.com
Individual Event at Tournamentsoftware.com

Badminton Asia Junior Championships
Asian Junior Badminton Championships
Asian Junior Badminton Championships
International sports competitions hosted by Malaysia
2008 in youth sport